Mirrabooka is an electoral district of the Legislative Assembly in the Australian state of Western Australia.

Geography
The district is based in the northern suburbs of Perth. It includes Alexander Heights, Balga, Koondoola, Mirrabooka, Westminster and parts of Ballajura and Dianella.

History
The district was created for the 2013 state election, essentially as a new name for the district of Nollamara. It was won by sitting Nollamara MP Janine Freeman.

An earlier incarnation of the district existed from 1968 to 1974. First contested at the 1968 state election, it was won by Doug Cash of the Liberal Party. Cash was defeated one term later by Labor candidate Arthur Tonkin. Mirrabooka was abolished at the 1974 state election, and Tonkin went on to become member for the new seat of Morley.

Members for Mirrabooka

Election results

References

External links
 WAEC district maps: current boundaries, previous distributions

Electoral districts of Western Australia